The 1997 Liverpool Victoria Charity Challenge was the third edition of the professional invitational snooker tournament, which took place in January 1997. The tournament was played at the International Convention Centre in Birmingham, England, and featured twelve professional players.

Stephen Hendry won the title, beating Ronnie O'Sullivan 9–8 in the final. Hendry had led 8–2, O'Sullivan won 6 frames in a row to level at 8–8, before Hendry made a 147 Maximum break in the deciding frame.


Main draw

Final

References

Champions Cup (snooker)
1997 in snooker
1997 in English sport